Eupithecia bella is a moth in the  family Geometridae. It is found in Russia (Amur).

References

Moths described in 1897
bella
Moths of Asia